Emepa Group S.A. (an acronym for Empresa Metalúrgica Patricias Argentinas) is an Argentine manufacturer of railway vehicles and owner of Ferrovías (which operates on the Belgrano Norte Line), with headquarters located in the city of Buenos Aires. It had formerly owned Ferrocentral, which ran services from Buenos Aires to Córdoba and San Miguel de Tucumán on the Mitre Network, however the state-owned company SOFSE took over these services in 2014 and the subsidiary now remains inactive.

Overview 

Emepa currently produces Alerce trains at the company's workshop in Chascomús. Current models are diesel multiple units which are being phased into the Belgrano Norte Line in Greater Buenos Aires with 20 two-carriage trains on order, however electric models will be made available in the future for other lines. The trains are made using 90% of the raw materials needed from Argentina and have a capacity for 240 people. In June 2015 it was announced that Emepa would produce a broad gauge variant of the Alerce for use on local service on the General Roca Railway.

Over the years the company has also restored and refurbished older rolling stock in Argentina, particularly for the Buenos Aires Underground. Some examples include modernised versions of the La Brugeoise cars and modernised versions of the Siemens-Schuckert Orenstein & Koppel rolling stock with Alstom.

The group owned both Ferrovías and Ferrocentral. Ferrovías still operates the Belgrano Norte Line, while Ferrocentral formerly operated services from Buenos Aires to Rosario, Córdoba and Tucumán as well as the Tren de las Sierras in Córdoba Province - services which were gradually taken over by Trenes Argentinos (SOFSE) in 2014 and 2015. The company had also owned Argentren, which operated the Roca and Belgrano Sur lines until they were also re-nationalised by the government in 2014.

Through Ferrovías, the company also operates the Lima Metro.

In the 1990s, Emepa (associated with Belgian company Jan de Nul) granted a concession to operate the Paraguay-Paraná Waterway.

Gallery

See also 
 Emepa Alerce
 Buenos Aires Underground rolling stock
 Materfer
 Rail transport in Argentina

References

External links

 Official website (archived, 1 Nov 2017)

 
Argentine brands
Rolling stock manufacturers of Argentina